Kayla Ahki (née McAlister; born 6 August 1988) is a New Zealand netball and rugby sevens player. She has previously played for the Northern Mystics in 2011, and was a training partner in 2012, and currently plays for the NZ Women's Rugby Sevens team. In 2013, McAlister was named the World Rugby Women's Player of the Year.

Of Māori descent, McAlister affiliates to the Te Āti Awa iwi. She is the sister of former All Black Luke McAlister.

References

External links
 Kayla McAlister at Black Ferns Sevens
 
 
 
 

1988 births
Living people
New Zealand netball players
New Zealand female rugby union players
New Zealand international rugby union players
New Zealand female rugby sevens players
New Zealand women's international rugby sevens players
New Zealand Māori rugby union players
Northern Mystics players
Rugby sevens players at the 2016 Summer Olympics
Olympic rugby sevens players of New Zealand
Te Āti Awa people
Olympic silver medalists for New Zealand
Olympic medalists in rugby sevens
Medalists at the 2016 Summer Olympics
People educated at Westlake Girls High School
New Zealand Māori netball players